Mathlouthi is a Tunisian surname which is – without the Arabic definite article Al-/El- – also common among the Tunisians in France. Notable people with this family name include:

 Ahmed Mathlouthi (born 1989), Tunisian swimmer
 Ali Mathlouthi (born 1987), French-Tunisian footballer
 Aymen Mathlouthi (born 1984), Tunisian footballer
 Emel Mathlouthi (born 1982), Tunisian singer-songwriter
 Hamza Mathlouthi (born 1992), Tunisian footballer
 Maroua Mathlouthi (born 1988), Tunisian swimmer

References 

Arabic-language surnames